Yahoo! News is a news website that originated as an internet-based news aggregator by Yahoo!. The site was created by a Yahoo! software engineer named Brad Clawsie in August 1996. Articles originally came from news services such as the Associated Press, Reuters, Fox News, Al Jazeera, ABC News, USA Today, CNN and BBC News.

In 2001, Yahoo! News launched the first "most-emailed" page on the web. It was well-received as an innovative idea, expanding people's understanding of the impact that online news sources have on news consumption. Yahoo allowed comments for news articles until December 19, 2006, when commentary was disabled. Comments were re-enabled on March 2, 2010.

By 2011, Yahoo had expanded its focus to include original content, as part of its plans to become a major media organization. Veteran journalists (including Walter Shapiro and Virginia Heffernan) were hired, while the website had a correspondent in the White House press corps for the first time in February 2012. An Amazon-owned marketing data collection company (Amazon Alexa) claimed Yahoo! News one of the world's top news sites, at this point. Plans were made to add a Twitter feed. In November, 2013, Yahoo hired former Today Show and CBS Evening News anchor Katie Couric as Global Anchor of Yahoo! News. She left in 2017.

On May 3, 2021, Verizon announced that the Verizon Media would be acquired by Apollo Global Management for roughly $5 billion, and would simply be known as Yahoo following the closure of the deal, with Verizon retaining a minor 10% stake in the new group. The deal was closed on September 1, 2021.

Yahoo! Celebrity 
Yahoo! Celebrity (as omg!) debuted on June 12, 2007, with little fanfare, with the original press release being published on Yahoo!'s corporate blog. Upon launch, MediaWeek reported that Yahoo is hoping to skew more toward a female demographic with omg!, and that Unilever, Pepsi, and Axiata (Celcom & XL) will be the sole official sponsors of the website. Due to heavy publicity on Yahoo's front page and with its partnerships, readership took off, with four million readers logging on to omg! in the first 19 days alone. As of autumn 2007, omg! registered over eight million readers a month, and is the second most-read gossip website in the United States, ahead of People and behind TMZ.com.

In December 2012, Yahoo! reached a deal with CBS Television Distribution to cross-promote its Entertainment Tonight spin-off The Insider with omg!, re-branding the show as omg! Insider. In January 2014 it was announced that CBS Television Distribution was to revert the name change back to The Insider while omg! would become Yahoo! Celebrity.

As part of an effort to increase reader trust, in September 2022, Yahoo! News (which aggregates articles from many other sources) acquired The Factual, a startup that uses artificial intelligence to rate the credibility of individual articles.

Mobile application
Yahoo! developed an application that collects the most-read news stories from different categories for iOS and Android. The app was one of the winners of 2014 Apple Design Awards.

Ranking
As of January 2019, Yahoo! News ranked sixth among global news sites, ahead of Fox News and behind CNN, according to Alexa.

See also
Apple News
Google News

References

External links
 
 

 
American news websites
News
Yahoo! community websites
IOS software
Internet properties established in 1996